Hilmi Yarayıcı (born 5 February 1969 in Antakya, Turkey) is a Turkish musician best known as the vocalist of Grup Yorum. In 1993, he joined the Istanbul Technical University (ITU) Turkish Music State Conservatory.

Discography
With Grup Yorum
 Cemo / Gün Gelir 1989
 Gel ki Şafaklar Tutuşsun 1990
 Yürek Çağrısı 1991
 Cesaret 1992
 Yıldızlar Kuşandık 2006

Solo albums
Sürgün
Sevdadan Yana
Salkım Söğüt 3

References

External links
 Grup Yorum albums
 Official website

1969 births
Living people
People from Antakya
Turkish male singers
Members of the 25th Parliament of Turkey
Members of the 26th Parliament of Turkey